Amaxia violacea is a moth of the family Erebidae. It was described by Reich in 1933. It is found in Peru.

References

Moths described in 1933
Amaxia
Moths of South America